Gesslerburg Castle is a castle in the municipality of Küssnacht of the Canton of Schwyz in Switzerland.  It is a Swiss heritage site of national significance.

See also
 List of castles in Switzerland

References

Cultural property of national significance in the canton of Schwyz
Küssnacht
Castles in the canton of Schwyz